In organic chemistry, a carboxylate is the conjugate base of a carboxylic acid,  (or ). It is an ion with negative charge.

Carboxylate salts are salts that have the general formula , where M is a metal and n is 1, 2,.... Carboxylate esters have the general formula  (also written as ), where R and R′ are organic groups.

Synthesis 
Carboxylate ions can be formed by deprotonation of carboxylic acids. Such acids typically have pKa of less than 5, meaning that they can be deprotonated by many bases, such as sodium hydroxide or sodium bicarbonate. 

RCOOH + NaOH -> RCOONa + H2O

Resonance stabilization of the carboxylate ion 

Carboxylic acids easily dissociate into a carboxylate anion and a positively charged hydrogen ion (proton), much more readily than alcohols do (into an alkoxide ion and a proton), because the carboxylate ion is stabilized by resonance. The negative charge that is left after deprotonation of the carboxyl group is delocalized between the two electronegative oxygen atoms in a resonance structure. If the R group is an electron-withdrawing group (such as –CF3), the basicity of the carboxylate will be further weakened.

This delocalization of the electron cloud means that both of the oxygen atoms are less strongly negatively charged; the positive proton is therefore less strongly attracted back to the carboxylate group once it has left; hence, the carboxylate ion is more stable and less basic as a result of resonance stabilization of the negative charge. In contrast, an alkoxide ion, once formed, would have a strong negative charge localized on its lone oxygen atom, which would strongly attract any nearby protons (indeed, alkoxides are very strong bases). Because of resonance stabilization, carboxylic acids have much lower pKa values (and are therefore stronger acids) than alcohols. For example, the pKa value of acetic acid is 4.8, while ethanol has a pKa of 16. Hence acetic acid is a much stronger acid than ethanol. This in turn means that for equimolar solutions of a carboxylic acid and an alcohol, the carboxylic acid would have a much lower pH.

Reactions

Nucleophilic substitution 
Carboxylate ions are good nucleophiles. They react with alkyl halides to form esters. The following reaction shows the reaction mechanism.

The nucleophilicity of carboxylate ions are much weaker than that of hydroxide and alkoxide ions, but stronger than halide anions (in a polar aprotic solvent, though there are other effects such as solubility of the ion).

Reduction 
Unlike the reduction of ester, the reduction of carboxylate is different, due to the lack of the leaving group and the relatively electron-rich carbon atom (due to the negative charge on the oxygen atoms). With a small amount of acid, the reaction occurs with lithium aluminium hydride by changing the LAH into the Lewis acid AlH3 in the process, converting the oxyanion to 4 Al–O bonds.

Examples
This list is for cases where there is a separate article for the anion or its derivatives. All other organic acids should be found at their parent carboxylic acid.
 Formate ion, HCOO−
 Acetate ion, CH3COO−
 Methanetetracarboxylate ion, C(COO−)4
 Oxalate ion,

See also
 Carboxylic acid

References

 
Anions...........